Multi-Facial is a 1995 American short drama film written, directed, produced, and scored by Vin Diesel. The film stars Diesel as a multiracial actor and depicts the professional and emotional issues he faces. Multi-Facial was noticed by Steven Spielberg, who would cast Diesel in Saving Private Ryan (1998). It was released on DVD in 1999.

Plot
Mike, a struggling actor with a tattooed arm, auditions for a role as an Italian American man. He delivers a profanity-laced anecdote in a New York Italian accent, about getting into a fight with another man in a restaurant for looking at his girlfriend. The anecdote ends with Mike saying that he discovered the man was a homosexual, so he beat up his girlfriend instead, and is surprised that she doesn't call him anymore. The casting director expresses interest and has Mike speak Italian before telling him they'll get back to him. When the director asks Mike where the monologue came from, Mike says that it's a true story that happened to his friend. Outside, Mike calls his manager and talks with his typical accent, not the one he used for the audition. He complains about the monologue, which wasn't a true story, saying it was offensive and worries that it will keep him from getting the job. He wipes the fake tattoo off his arm and goes to his next audition.
 
At an audition for a commercial, Mike meets a black actor in the waiting room and the two of them talk about their careers. Mike tells the actor about the audition he just left, and again complains that he thought his monologue was offensive. The actor tells Mike he has just landed a role in an international commercial, but Mike says he doesn't want to do commercials because no great actors have had to do commercials. Before he can audition, the director tells Mike that his skin is "a little too light" and not to bother auditioning. He suggests Mike audition for a Spanish role in a soap opera instead.

Mike goes to another audition and reads with a Cuban accent alongside a Hispanic actress. The two of them are portraying an argument, but when the actress launches into Spanish, Mike is unable to continue. As they leave the audition, the actress guesses correctly that Mike doesn't speak Spanish. She suggests that he try out for a soap opera which is looking for Hispanic actors, but Mike says he doesn't want to do soaps because no great actors have ever done them. Mike attends another audition, where the woman reading with him tells him that she really thinks he could do well. Mike does the reading with her in a heavy urban accent, but the casting directors cut the audition short, saying they're looking for more of a "Wesley type".

Mike moves on to another audition, where they are expecting him from a previous audition. The casting director sees on his resume that Mike can rap; Mike launches into a hip-hop routine. Afterwards, Mike sits down and does a monologue about being a young man watching his father on stage in a performance of Raisin in the Sun. During his father's performance, Mike came to believe that his father wanted him to be a great black actor. After his father died, Mike realized that his father wanted him to be a great actor full stop. When the monologue is finished, the casting director is impressed with Mike's performance, but admits that they are supposed to be casting an actor with dreadlocks. Mike leaves with a promise that they will contact him if they can cast him instead.

The film cuts to Mike sitting silently and angrily at a booth in a diner. He overhears an actress talking to another man about how frustrated she is to be typecast as a blonde bimbo. When the waitress comes, the actress orders coffee that's "not too light, not too dark". Mike chuckles to himself and mouths the words "not too light, not too dark".

Production
Multi-Facial was written, directed, produced, and scored by Vin Diesel. The film is semi-autobiographical, drawing on Diesel's own frustration trying to find work as an actor of mixed ethnicity. In the early 1990s, Diesel returned from Los Angeles to New York, frustrated with his failures in Hollywood. His mother gave him a copy of Feature Films at Used Car Prices, a book about producing low-budget movies. Diesel said that he found the book "truly empowering" and it motivated him to make his own movies.

Diesel wrote a script for a feature film called Strays, but as an unknown, he was unable to secure financing for it. He decided to produce a short film instead and wrote the script for Multi-Facial in one night. He shot it over the course of three days for three thousand dollars. He also wrote and performed music for the film. However, he became disillusioned by the response to the film and stopped work on it. With encouragement from his stepfather, he finished the final edit and screened the film at the Anthology Film Archives in Manhattan. He received a strong response, and the film was accepted for the 1995 Cannes Film Festival. The film was screened to standing-room only crowds.

Impact on Diesel's career
At age 27, Diesel "would drive around [Los Angeles] with VHS copies of [the film] in the trunk just in case [he] bumped into someone who could help [him] with [his] dreams". Upon seeing Morgan Freeman outside a Four Seasons hotel, he approached Freeman and handed him a copy of the film. In 1997, Steven Spielberg saw Strays (having already been impressed with Diesel's performance in Multi-Facial) and wrote a role into Saving Private Ryan specifically for Diesel as a result, giving him his first major film role.

References

External links
 
 
 
 Multi-Facial film review at Allwatchers.com

1995 films
1995 drama films
1995 independent films
1995 short films
American short films
American independent films
Films about actors
Films about race and ethnicity
Films directed by Vin Diesel
Films produced by Vin Diesel
1990s English-language films
1990s American films